In April 1816, James Clark (DR), of , resigned his seat to accept a position as circuit court judge.  A special election was held for his replacement.

Election results

Fletcher took his seat on December 2, at the start of the second session of the 14th Congress.

See also
List of special elections to the United States House of Representatives

References

Kentucky 1816 01
1816 01
Kentucky 1816 01
1816 Kentucky elections
Kentucky 01
United States House of Representatives 1816 01